

Distribution

A32 is most common around the Persian Gulf and the Mediterranean Basin.  It has a consistent presence in Europe.  The A32 frequencies in the more isolated (genetically) peoples of Europe suggests that the A32 rise in the Mediterranean may only be partially attributable to recent migrations from the middle eastern region.  There is a node in southern Europe around the Ionian Sea in which specific, European, A32-haplotypes are elevated.

Haplotypes

A common A32 haplotype A*3201-B*5101 can be found in Oman, United Arab Emirates, SE Iran, Bulgaria, and Portugal.  A second, A*3201-B*3501 can be in the Omani, UAE, and Portugal.

References 

3